Republican Coalition (CR) was a Spanish electoral alliance formed to contest the 1996 general election by the Internationalist Socialist Workers' Party (POSI) and Socialist Democratic Alliance (ADS).

Member parties
Internationalist Socialist Workers' Party (POSI)
Socialist Democratic Alliance (ADS)

References

Defunct political party alliances in Spain
Communist parties in Spain